"Breakadawn" is a 1993 single by American hip hop trio De La Soul, released from their third album, Buhloone Mindstate. It samples "Quiet Storm" by Smokey Robinson and the intro to Michael Jackson's "I Can't Help It", from his Off the Wall album. Additionally, the song samples "Sang and Dance" by The Bar-Kays. It was a number one hit on the European Dance Radio Chart, while peaking at number 39 in the UK.

Track listing
"Breakadawn (Vocal Version)" - 4:15
"Stickabush" - 1:11
Guest Appearance: Dres of Black Sheep
"En Focus (Vocal Version)" - 3:15
Guest Appearance: Dres of Black Sheep
"The Dawn Brings Smoke" - 2:11
"Hsubakcits" - 0:15
Guest Appearance: Dres of Black Sheep
"En Focus (Instrumental)" - 3:15
"Breakadawn (Instrumental)" - 4:15

Charts

References

1993 singles
De La Soul songs
Tommy Boy Records singles
1993 songs
Songs written by Vincent Mason
Songs written by Kelvin Mercer
Songs written by David Jude Jolicoeur
Songs written by Prince Paul (producer)
Song recordings produced by Prince Paul (producer)